Western Catholic Educational Association (WCEA) is an educational accreditation agency for Roman Catholic schools in part of the United States. It is based in Fullerton, California.

See also
History of Catholic education in the United States
Western Association of Schools and Colleges

References

External links

School accreditors
Catholic education
Educational organizations based in the United States